Bosc-Guérard-Saint-Adrien is a commune in the Seine-Maritime department in the Normandy region in northern France.

Geography

Population

Places of interest
 The church of St.Pierre-et-Paul, dating from the thirteenth century.
 The seventeenth century Château du Bosc Théroulde, once owned by François de Montmorency.
 A fifteenth century manorhouse at Plessis, with a dovecote and chapel.
 The chapel of Saint-Adrien at Bosc-Théroulde, dating from the eighteenth century.

See also
Communes of the Seine-Maritime department

References

Communes of Seine-Maritime